AIBI International Pte Ltd is an international company operating in health industry. It produces and distributes beauty, health, and fitness products such as Treadmills, Elliptical Trainers, and Inversion Machines. It was originally established in 1985 in Singapore. It carries brands such as
Adidas, Life Fitness, Reebok, and Slendertone.

Etymology

AIBI stands for Achieving Individual's Beliefs through Innovation.

Achievements
AIBI has received the Singapore Promising Brand Award in 2003 and 2004.

External links
AIBI International - Official website
AIBI Gym Website

Health care companies of Singapore
Singaporean brands